Wade Paton (born 21 March 1986 in Durban) is a South African field hockey player. At the 2012 Summer Olympics, he competed for the national team in the tournament.  He has captained the South African team, deputizing in place of Austin Smith when Smith was injured.

He is an old boy at Northwood School in Durban North. Wade was a Prefect in his matric year.

His father is Alan Paton, who owns The Hockey Shop Durban, which is situated at Northwood Boys High School. The brother of Taine Paton.

Wade Paton is sponsored by Mr Price Sport and performs in Maxed.

References

External links
 
 
 
 
 

1986 births
Living people
South African male field hockey players
Olympic field hockey players of South Africa
Field hockey players at the 2012 Summer Olympics
Commonwealth Games competitors for South Africa
Field hockey players at the 2014 Commonwealth Games
Alumni of Maritzburg College
Sportspeople from Durban
South African people of British descent
2010 Men's Hockey World Cup players
2014 Men's Hockey World Cup players

2018 FIH Indoor Hockey World Cup players